Jean-Marc Pilorget (born 13 April 1958) is a French former professional footballer and manager. He holds the record of the most appearances for Paris Saint-Germain, with 435 matches.

Club career
Pilorget is the all-time leader in appearances for Paris Saint-Germain, with 435 matches across all competitions. He scored a total of 17 goals and made 20 assists in his 14-year stay at the Parisian club.

International career 
Pilorget represented France at U21 level in 1977, but never played for the senior side during his entire career.

Managerial career
Pilorget coached Paris FC in 2008, and was fired on 29 September 2009. He managed Championnat de France Amateur side Cannes until June 2015, when he took over Fréjus Saint-Raphael.

References

External links
Profile

1958 births
Living people
Footballers from Paris
French footballers
Association football defenders
FC Morangis-Chilly players
Paris Saint-Germain F.C. players
AS Cannes players
En Avant Guingamp players
Ligue 1 players
Ligue 2 players
French football managers
Paris FC managers
AS Cannes managers
France youth international footballers
France under-21 international footballers